Emojiland is a pop musical written by Keith Harrison Dworkin and Laura Schein. It premiered off-Broadway on January 19, 2020, at the Duke on 42nd Street. It centers around a group of emojis living in the world of a smartphone on the eve of a software update.

Background
"Not to be confused with, and very much unlike The Emoji Movie, Emojiland is an electric ensemble piece about a diverse community of archetypes who take one another at face value: a smiling face dealing with depression; a princess who doesn’t want a prince; a skull dying for deletion; a nerd face too smart for his own good; a face with sunglasses who can’t see past his own reflection; and a police officer and construction worker who just want to work together. When a software update threatens to destroy life as they know it, Emojiland faces the most fundamental questions a society – and a heart – can face: Who are we? And who matters?"

Productions 

Emojiland was first performed live in concert in Los Angeles.

Emojiland was first presented in New York City on July 22, 2018, as part of the New York Musical Theatre Festival. It was staged at the Acorn Theater at Theater Row.

Off-Broadway 

After its success as part of the New York Musical Theatre Festival, the show premiered Off-Broadway on January 19, 2020, at The Duke on 42nd Street. 

It starred Lesli Margherita as Princess, Josh Lamon as Prince, George Abud as Nerd Face, Laura Schein as Smiling Face with Smiling Eyes aka Smize, Lucas Steele as Skull, and Ann Harada as Pile of Poo.

The production was directed by Thomas Caruso, and choreographed by Kenny Ingram, with musical direction by Lena Gabrielle. It featured scenic design by David Goldstein, costume and make-up design by Vanessa Leuck, lighting design by Jamie Roderick, sound design by Ken Goodwin, hair and wig design by Bobbie Zlotnik, and projection design by Lisa Renkel and Possible Productions. 

The musical was a Critic's Pick from The New York Times and played a total of 11 Previews and 59 Performances before the COVID-19 shutdown. 

In May 2022, the show announced a non-union national tour beginning in June 2022, but was subsequently cancelled after its first stop in Columbus, Ohio.

West End Concert 

In October 2022 a one-off concert version of the show was held at the Garrick Theatre in heart of London’s West End. It featured a star-studded British cast including Olly Dobson as Skull, Louise Dearman as Princess, Hannah Lowther as Kissyface and Natalie Paris as Construction Worker.

Musical numbers 

 Act 1
 "Overture" – Orchestra 
 "It’s Just So Great To Be Alive" – Company
 "Sad On The Inside" – Smize
 "Princess Is a Bitch" – Princess
 "The Progress Bar" – Company
 "Zeros & Ones" – Nerd Face, Smize
 "Cross My Bones" - Skull, Nerd Face
 "New Crown In Town" – Prince
 "Work Together" – Police Officer, Construction Worker
 "Stand For" – Construction Worker
 "Thank Me Now" – Skull

 Act 2
 "Entr’acte" – Orchestra
 "Firewall Ball" – Prince, Princess, Sunny, Company
 "Pile Of Poo" – Pile of Poo
 "Virus" – Company
 "A Thousand More Words" – Police Officer
 "Anyway" – Smize, Nerd Face
 "Start Again" – Nerd Face, Skull
 "It’s Just So Great To Be Alive (Reprise)" – Company
|}

Original Off-Broadway cast and characters

Awards and honors

Original Off-Broadway production

References 

Off-Broadway musicals
Emoji